Club Comunicaciones is an Argentine sports club based in the Agronomía district of Buenos Aires. The football team currently plays in Primera B Metropolitana, the regionalised third division of the Argentine football league system

History
The club was founded for a group of employees of the Argentine Post office company. The name chosen was Club Atlético Correos y Telégrafos, referring to the name of the State mail company they worked for. In 1953 the club changed to its current name.

At a sporting level, Comunicaciones offers a large variety of activities, such as gymnasiums, basketball courts, roller hockey, handball, tennis courts, extra football pitches and the main stadium.
The club also is famous for having hosted the carnival celebrations during the 1950s and 1960s.

The colors that identify the club (yellow and black) were adopted because of those were the distinctive colors used by mail companies worldwide.
The football squad has never played in the top category in Argentina.

Financial problems
By 2011 the club has a debt of $ 6,700 million and had been declared in bankruptcy. Many offerent showed their interest in buying Comunicaciones: the Government of the City of Buenos Aires was one of them.

Players

Titles

Primera C (2): 1969, 2004–05

References

External links

 Official site

Football clubs in Buenos Aires
Association football clubs established in 1931
1931 establishments in Argentina